Your Body Sub Atomic is a 20th anniversary remix album of the Stakker Humanoid release and other tracks by Brian Dougans; the remixes are by both new and established artists and DJs. The digital download comes with an Adobe Flash liner "booklet" (with a looping ambient track) detailing the title tracks story and the remixers, it also comes with a high quality video of the "Feadz 2007 Mix" in .m4v format.

Track listing
 3am and Feeling OK (9:09)
Remix - King Roc
 Broken Machine (Legiac Mix) (6:23)
Remix - Legiac
 Body Electric (Graham Massey Mix) (6:00)
Remix - Graham Massey
 Stakker Humanoid (Feadz 2007 Mix) (4:01)
Remix - Feadz
 Stakker Humanoid (Kouncilhouse Remix) (6:10)
 1.0.1 (3:07)
 Static Motioned (Cane Mix) (4:57)
Remix - Cane
 Deep Rooted (King Roc Mix) (7:15)
Remix - King Roc
 Stakker Humanoid (James Talk Mix) (8:04)
Remix - James Talk
 "Acid To The Bone" (11:10)
 XO Thermic (Pirate Robot Midget Mix) (4:33)
Remix - Pirate Robot Midget
 "Negative Electron" (2:43)
 Stakker Humanoid (The X-Tra Mix) (4:04)
 Stakker 300 (Stakker Humanoid) (4:56)
Remix - Scan X
 Stakker Humanoid (Feadz Rmx Trailer) (1:25)

Crew
Humanoid et al. written, produced by Brian Dougans.
Remixes as stated above.

References

External links
 

The Future Sound of London albums
2007 albums